Ulotrichopus fatilega is a moth of the  family Erebidae. It is found in Kenya, South Africa, Tanzania, Uganda and Zimbabwe.

References

Moths described in 1874
Ulotrichopus
Moths of Africa